Consuegra is a surname. Notable people with the surname include:

Agustín Díaz De Mera García Consuegra (born 1947), Spanish politician
Cara Consuegra (born 1979), American basketball coach
David Consuegra (1939–2004), Colombian graphic designer and illustrator
Hugo Consuegra (born 1929), Cuban-American architect and artist
Rafael Consuegra (born 1941), US-based Cuban artist 
Sandy Consuegra (1920–2005), Cuban-born American baseball player